Philip of Hesse-Darmstadt (20 July 1671 in Darmstadt – 11 August 1736 in Vienna) was a Prince of Hesse-Darmstadt, Imperial Field marshal and Governor of Mantua.

Life 
Philip was a younger son of Louis VI, Landgrave of Hesse-Darmstadt (1630–1678) and his second wife Princess Elisabeth Dorothea of Saxe-Gotha-Altenburg (1640–1709), daughter of Ernest I, Duke of Saxe-Gotha and Princess Elisabeth Sophie of Saxe-Altenburg.

Philip fought for the Habsburgs in the Spanish War of Succession and became in 1708 Field Marshal and Supreme Commander of the Imperial troops in newly conquered Naples. After the war in 1714, under influence of Prince Eugene of Savoy, he became governor of the former Duchy of Mantua until his death.

Philip was a great lover of music. When he commanded the Austrian Army in Naples, he was patron of Nicola Porpora, and when he was governor of Mantua, he made Antonio Vivaldi Maestro di Cappella of his court. Vivaldi wrote the opera Tito Manlio in Philip's honor.

Marriage and issue 

On 24 March 1693, in Brussels, Philip married Princess Marie Ernestine of Croÿ (1673–1714), daughter of Duke Ferdinand Joseph of Croy-Havré (1644-1694) and his wife, Countess Marie Joséphine Barbe van Halewijn de Hames (d. 1713). For this marriage, he converted to Catholicism, despite heavy protest of his mother.
They had 5 children : 
 Joseph (1699−1768), Prince-Bishop of Augsburg
 Wilhelm Ludwig (1704, died young)
 Theodora (6 February 1706 – 23 January 1784), married in 1727 Duke Antonio Ferrante Gonzaga of Guastalla (1687–1729), no issue.
 Leopold (1708–1764), Imperial Field marshal, married in 1740 Princess Enrichetta d'Este of Modena (1702–1777)
Charles (1710)

Literature 
Andreas Räss: Die Convertiten seit der Reformation S. 467 ff.
Alfred Arneth: Prinz Eugen von Savoyen, Wien, 1864
Alessandro Cont, La Chiesa dei principi. Le relazioni tra Reichskirche, dinastie sovrane tedesche e stati italiani (1688-1763), preface of Elisabeth Garms-Cornides, Trento, Provincia autonoma di Trento, 2018, pp. 159–165, https://www.academia.edu/38170694/La_Chiesa_dei_principi._Le_relazioni_tra_Reichskirche_dinastie_sovrane_tedesche_e_stati_italiani_1688-1763_prefazione_di_Elisabeth_Garms-Cornides_Trento_Provincia_autonoma_di_Trento_2018

References

External links 
http://www.geneall.net/D/per_page.php?id=4495

House of Hesse
1671 births
1736 deaths
Military personnel from Darmstadt
House of Hesse-Darmstadt
Field marshals of Austria
Austrian army commanders in the War of the Spanish Succession
Generals of the Holy Roman Empire
Nobility from Darmstadt
Sons of monarchs